The 1991 Giro d'Italia was the 74th edition of the Giro d'Italia, one of cycling's Grand Tours. The Giro began in Olbia, with a mountainous stage on 26 May, and Stage 11 occurred on 6 June with a stage from Sala Baganza. The race finished in Milan on 16 June.

Stage 11
6 June 1991 — Sala Baganza to Savona,

Stage 12

Stage 13
8 June 1991 — Savigliano to Sestriere,

Stage 14
9 June 1991 — Turin to Morbegno,

Stage 15
10 June 1991 — Morbegno to Aprica,

Stage 16
11 June 1991 — Tirano to Selva di Val Gardena,

Stage 17
12 June 1991 — Selva di Val Gardena to Passo Pordoi,

Stage 18
13 June 1991 — Pozza di Fassa to Castelfranco Veneto,

Stage 19
14 June 1991 — Castelfranco Veneto to Brescia,

Stage 20
15 June 1991 — Broni to Casteggio,  (ITT)

Stage 21
16 June 1991 — Pavia to Milan,

References

1991 Giro d'Italia
Giro d'Italia stages